The European Climate Forum (ECF) is a platform for joint studies and science-based stakeholder dialogues on climatic change. ECF brings together representatives of different parties concerned with the climate problem.
 
Since the work of the Europe Climate Forum expanded beyond Europe, and with one of its largest and longest-running projects, the Integrated Risk Governance Project, being carried out in China, as well as other research work in the USA and Australia, the name was changed to Global Climate Forum in January 2012 to reflect this expansion.

See also
Klaus Hasselmann

External links
 Global Climate Forum

International climate change organizations
European Union and the environment
Pan-European scientific societies
Non-profit organisations based in Berlin